WorldTicket (WT) was founded in 2002 and is a global provider of information technology and software to airlines. In May 2022, it was announced WT had been acquired by the Miami-based private investment company 777 Partners.

Overview
WorldTicket has developed the passenger service system called Sell-More-Seats, which is consolidated with the global distribution systems and is built on HTML 5 technology and follows IATA e-ticket standards. It has the IATA code W1 and is listed as an IATA Strategic Partner, and is headquartered in Denmark, with additional offices in Poland, Ukraine, Thailand and China.

In 2011, WorldTicket acquired the Danish-based airline FlexFlight, with the IATA two-letter code W2.

See also

 Passenger service system
 Amadeus IT Group
 Sabre
 Travelport
 IATA

References 

Travel technology
Companies based in Copenhagen
Information technology companies of Denmark
2002 establishments in Denmark
Companies established in 2002
Companies based in Copenhagen Municipality
2022 mergers and acquisitions